The TSYD Cup (Turkish Sports Writers Association Cup) was a friendly football competition in Turkey. The tournament started in 1963. It was played throughout six regions in Turkey: Adana, Ankara, Istanbul, İzmir, Konya, and Trabzon. The competition's major leg which was played between the "Big Three"; Fenerbahçe, Galatasaray, and Beşiktaş became defunct in 1999. The competition is still running in Ankara with four clubs, prior to the first week of each season.

The TSYD Challenge Cup (Turkish: Çalenç Kupası) was awarded to clubs which won the TSYD Cup three times within a five-year span.

Winners

Adana

Ankara

Istanbul

İzmir

Konya

Trabzon

TSYD Challenge Cup

References

External links
Rsssf.com, Turkey - List of TSYD Istanbul Cup Winners

Turkish football friendly trophies
Defunct football cup competitions in Turkey
1963 establishments in Turkey
2000 disestablishments in Turkey
Recurring sporting events established in 1963
Recurring sporting events disestablished in 2000